Zvi Erlich (7 November 1909 – 17 June 1983), also nicknamed Doctor, was an Israeli football player and manager. As a player, he played as a forward for Hapoel Tel Aviv and the Mandatory Palestine national team. Erlich took part in Mandatory Palestine's last international match against Lebanon in 1940; it was his only international cap.

References

External links

 Zvi Erlich at maccabipedia.co.il
 

1909 births
1983 deaths
Jewish Israeli sportspeople
Association football outside forwards
Association football forwards
Mandatory Palestine footballers
Israeli footballers
Mandatory Palestine international footballers
Maccabi Tel Aviv F.C. players
Hapoel Tel Aviv F.C. players
Israeli football managers
Hapoel Ramat Gan F.C. managers
Maccabi Tel Aviv F.C. managers
Hapoel Tel Aviv F.C. managers